Ishwarganj Degree College is a public university-college located in Ishwarganj, Mymensingh near the Kacamatia river in Bangladesh.

History
Ishwarganj Degree College was established in 1968, in Ishwarganj, Mymensingh and it's the first college in Ishwarganj Upazila

References

Colleges in Mymensingh District
Education in Mymensingh
1968 establishments in East Pakistan